The 2016 Volta a Catalunya was a road cycling stage race that took place in Catalonia, Spain, from 21 to 27 March. It was the fifth race of the 2016 UCI World Tour and the 96th edition of the Volta a Catalunya.

The race included seven stages. Two of these included summit finishes, so the favourites for the race were all climbers. Favourites for overall victory included Chris Froome, Alberto Contador, Nairo Quintana and the defending champion Richie Porte: the race was the first meeting of several of the riders expected to feature in the Grand Tours later in the season.

The first two stages were Nacer Bouhanni. He then withdrew through illness on the third stage, which included the first summit finish. This was won by Dan Martin, who took over the overall lead. Martin lost the lead, however, on the next stage, the second summit finish of the race, where Quintana won the stage and took over the overall lead. Quintana defended his lead over the following stage to take the overall victory, seven seconds ahead of Contador, with Martin ten seconds further back in third. Thomas De Gendt won both the mountains and intermediate sprints classifications, with Hugh Carthy winning the young rider classification. BMC won the team classification.

Route 

The 2016 Volta a Catalunya included seven stages, all of which were road stages with no time trials. The first two stages were moderately hilly and were possibly suitable for sprinters. The third and fourth stage both included summit finishes. The third stage finished on the climb of La Molina, with the fourth finishing at Port Ainé. The fifth stage included a climb shortly before the finish, giving an opportunity for an attack, before another flat stage on the sixth day. The final stage finished on a hilly circuit in Barcelona.

Following the cancellation of mountain stages in both Paris–Nice and Tirreno–Adriatico in the previous weeks, there was some concern before the start of the race that the Volta might also be affected by heavy snow; the finish at Port Ainé still had  of snow on the nearby ski slopes.

Participating teams 
The race organisers invited 25 teams to enter the Volta a Catalunya. These included the eighteen UCI WorldTeams, which were automatically invited and obliged to enter a team. Seven Professional Continental teams received wild card invitations Each team could include eight riders.  only included seven riders in their team, so 199 riders started the first stage.

Pre-race favourites 

The race was expected to be decided on its two mountainous days and so was particularly suited for climbers. Cyclingnews.com described the list of favourites for victory at the Volta as "formidable" and as including "almost all the main contenders for both the Giro d'Italia and the Tour de France". Foremost among these was Chris Froome, the reigning champion of the Tour de France. Froome's only previous race in the 2016 season was the Herald Sun Tour, which he won. Froome had a strong team that included two other possible contenders for overall victory: Geraint Thomas (who had won Paris–Nice) and Wout Poels (who had won the Volta a la Comunitat Valenciana). Froome's form was, however, described by his directeur sportif as "an incognito", given the long period since his last race.

The prominent riders competing with Froome for overall victory included Alberto Contador, the reigning champion of the Giro d'Italia; Nairo Quintana, who was second in the 2016 Tour de France; Fabio Aru, the reigning champion of the Vuelta a España; and Richie Porte, the defending champion of the Volta itself. Other riders with a chance of high placings included Joaquim Rodríguez, who had won the race on two previous occasions, and Dan Martin, the 2013 Volta winner, as well as many other climbers.

On account of the mountainous terrain, there were few pure sprinters starting the race. The strongest sprinter who was present was Nacer Bouhanni, who had been strong in Paris–Nice and had been close to victory in Milan–San Remo until his chain slipped.

Stages

Stage 1 

21 March 2016, Calella to Calella, 

The first stage of the Volta covered a  course that started and ended on the coast in Calella; the course looped through an inland region and crossed several climbs. After first travelling along the coast, the riders turned north as far as Anglès, then turned west to cross the day's first climb, the second-category Alt de les Guilleries, followed immediately by the third-category Alt de Viladrau. As the roads turned back to the south, there was then a flat section before the biggest climb of the day, the first-category Coli Formic. After the descent came the second-category Alt de Montseny and the final climb of the day, the third-category Alt de Collsacreu.

An early breakaway was formed by Lluís Mas, Boris Dron and Cameron Meyer; they built a lead of over six minutes. From the climb of the Coll Formic, however, they were chased by Movistar and Cofidis; Meyer was the first over the summit to take the lead of the mountains classification, but they were caught soon afterwards. On the Alt de Montseny, Louis Vervaeke broke away, with a six-man group chasing; meanwhile the main group split in two until Vasil Kiryienka (Sky) pulled the groups back together.

With  remaining, Sky and Cofidis came to the front of the peloton to control the race for their sprinters. Björn Thurau attacked and was quickly brought back; Nicolas Roche (Sky) then attacked on a slight uphill section of road with approximately  remaining and built a twelve-second lead. He was caught, however, by Tinkoff and Orica–GreenEDGE within the final . After Katusha led the peloton under the flamme rouge, Orica–GreenEDGE opened up the sprint with Simon Gerrans. Ben Swift (Sky) and Nacer Bouhanni (Cofidis) followed Gerrans and Bouhanni came past to win the stage. Swift was second, with Gerrans third.

Stage 2 

22 March, Mataró to Olot, 

The second stage was raced over a  course from Mataró to Olot. The stage was generally flat, with two categorised climbs. The first of these was the third-category Alt de Can Bordoi after . The second was the first-category Alt de Els Angels; at the summit of the climb there were  remaining. In the final , the roads rose again, although there was not a categorised climb and the final kilometres were flat. There was a 270° turn with just over  remaining; after this the road was straight all the way to the finish.

Before the stage started, there was a minute's silence to acknowledge the bombings in Brussels that morning, with many riders – especially the Belgians – wearing black armbands. There was a four-man early breakaway that included two Belgians – Boris Dron and Thomas De Gendt – alongside Kamil Gradek (Verva ActiveJet) and Maxime Bouet (Etixx–QuickStep). Dron was first across both categorised climbs, with De Gendt winning both intermediate sprints and the associated bonus seconds. Dron fell away from the break with  remaining; shortly afterwards De Gendt attacked alone. About  later, however, he gave up on his effort, as Cofidis were chasing too hard in the main peloton.

In the final , there were several teams attempting to control the peloton – including Team Sky with Chris Froome sitting in second place in an attempt to keep him out of danger. Movistar moved to the front with  remaining, with FDJ and Orica–GreenEDGE also at the front. In the final , however, Cofidis moved back to the front, with Geoffrey Soupe leading out Bouhanni. Bouhanni easily won the sprint, with Gianni Meersman second and Philippe Gilbert (BMC) third. Bouhanni therefore extended his lead to 14 seconds ahead of Swift – who finished outside the top 10 – and De Gendt, who moved up to third thanks to the bonus seconds he won. Bouhanni revealed after the stage that he had been suffering from a sore stomach and had visited the race doctor.

Stage 3 

23 March, Girona to La Molina, 

The third stage included the first summit finish of the race. It covered a  route from Girona to the La Molina ski resort. The route generally took the riders north-west, with four first-category climbs along the way. After passing through Olot, where Stage 2 had finished, the riders crossed the Alt de Coubet after . After the descent, the riders passed through Alp, then began the first climb to La Molina, a  climb at an average gradient of 4.2%, including a descent towards the top. The riders then descended back into Alp and repeated the climb; the finish of the stage came at the ski station itself.

The day's early breakaway was formed by seven riders: Julian Alaphilippe, Koen Bouwman (LottoNL–Jumbo), Kévin Reza (FDJ), Johann van Zyl (Dimension Data), Jan Hirt, Huub Duyn and Alex Howes (Cannondale). On the day's first climb, Bouhanni lost several minutes due to his stomach illness; after  he was over seven minutes behind the peloton and was forced to retire from the race. Howes and Duyn attacked the breakaway and had a 31-second lead going into the first of the two ascents of La Molina. During the climb, Pieter Weening (Roompot) attacked from the peloton and caught the two breakaway riders; almost immediately he attacked alone and built a gap. Meanwhile, Team Sky led the peloton with all eight riders, with Movistar close behind; they quickly caught Howes and Duyn. Weening had about a minute's advantage at the top of the climb.

During the descent, the peloton chased hard and reduced Weening's advantage to 30 seconds, with Sky still leading the peloton. Louis Meintjes (Lampre–Mérida) crashed shortly before the final climb began. On the climb, Louis Vervaeke attacked with  remaining and passed Weening. Within the final , the peloton caught him and the peloton stayed together, led by Sky, as the road descended briefly before the final ascent to the finishing line. Wout Poels (Sky) attacked as the road began to rise, but was followed by Contador. Quintana attacked next and was chased by Ilnur Zakarin (Katusha) and Contador. Richie Porte attempted to escape the group, but he was chased down by Froome. Quintana then attacked again and was followed by Dan Martin, who then passed Quintana and moved into the lead. Tejay van Garderen (BMC) chased, with Contador following, but Martin was able to stay away to the finish line. Contador finished two seconds back, with Romain Bardet third and van Garderen fourth, all on the same time. With the bonus seconds, Martin moved into the overall lead, six seconds ahead of Contador.

Stage 4 

24 March, Bagà to Port Ainé, 

The fourth stage included the second and final summit finish of the race. It covered a  route from Bagà to Port Ainé, with four categorised climbs on the route. The first climb came at the very beginning of the day's racing; it was a third-category climb whose summit came  into the stage. There was then a long flat section – which passed through Alp again – before the special-category Port de Cantó. After a steep descent, there was a first-category climb, followed by a descent.

The early breakaway was formed by Philippe Gilbert (BMC), Imanol Erviti (Movistar), Rubén Plaza (Orica–GreenEDGE), Thomas De Gendt (Lotto–Soudal), Laurens ten Dam, Kristijan Đurasek (Lampre–Mérida), Pieter Weening (Roompot), Boris Dron, Alexey Tsatevich (Katusha) and Ben Swift (Team Sky). Dron won the special-category climb, with the lead over the peloton at around ten minutes. The breakaway then broke up, with De Gendt and Erviti continuing together at the front of the race; on the penultimate climb, they had a seven-minute advantage on the peloton. Weening made contact with them again just before the summit of the climb and they collaborated on the descent. Coming towards the base of the final climb, Wout Poels (Sky) attacked from the peloton and linked up with Swift; despite their work, they were unable to build a significant advantage as Contador chased them.

On the final climb, Erviti attacked, but he was soon passed by Weening, who built up a minute's lead. Poels was eventually caught with  remaining, while De Gendt had caught up with Weening again. There were several attacks in the peloton, from Mikel Nieve (Sky), Robert Gesink and Miguel Ángel López (Astana), but the first strong attack came from van Garderen. Contador eventually chased him, with Porte, Quintana and Martin following, but Martin was soon dropped. Van Garderen was caught by Contador's group and Contador and Quintana then dropped the BMC riders. Meanwhile, De Gendt passed Weening and continued solo to take the stage win. Quintana attacked in the final  and finished second, 15 seconds ahead of Porte and Contador. Quintana therefore took over the race lead, with Contador eight seconds behind in second.

After the stage, Contador blamed his time loss to Quintana on the effort he had put into chasing down attacks in the final kilometres, in particular that of van Garderen. Porte also praised van Garderen's efforts and was pleased with their collaboration. Froome, meanwhile, lost 37 seconds to Quintana and his directeur sportif, Nicolas Portal, said that he "didn't have the legs" to follow the leaders' attacks.

Stage 5 

25 March, Rialp to Valls, 

After two consecutive summit finishes, the fifth stage was simpler, with a  stage with just two categorised climbs. The route took the riders south from Rialp to Valls. The first  of the stage was fairly flat, before the second-category Port d'Àger climb. The roads continued to be flat until the final  of the stage. First there was an uncategorised climb with a summit around  before the finish. After the final descent, the road slightly to the finish.

No breakaway was formed in the first two-and-a-half hours of racing. Dan Martin won the day's first intermediate sprint, earning him three bonus seconds, with Contador taking one second for third place at the sprint. The riders in the breakaway were Carlos Verona (Etixx–Quick-Step), Dario Cataldo (Astana), Jan Polanc (Lampre–Mérida), Kanstantsin Sivtsov (Dimension Data), Tosh Van der Sande (Lotto–Soudal), and Gaëtan Bille and Frederik Veuchelen (both Wanty–Groupe Gobert). With  remaining, the breakaway had two minutes' lead. On the Alt de Lilla, Poels attacked alone. At the summit, Poels had a lead of 20 seconds over the other breakaway riders. Cataldo and Verona attempted to chase him down, but their failure to collaborate in the chase meant that Sivtsov and Bille were able to catch them; Poels's lead extended to 30 seconds. In the final kilometres, the chase group got closer to him, but he was able to take the stage win, eleven seconds ahead of the chasing group.

In the main peloton, Quintana followed Contador on the climb. Daniel Navarro (Cofidis), Rigoberto Urán (Cannondale) and Romain Bardet all attempted attacks but were unable to escape. The peloton of 66 riders finished 33 seconds behind Poels, with no change to the overall standings.

Stage 6 

26 March, Sant Joan Despí to Vilanova i la Geltrú, 

The sixth stage took the riders  from Sant Joan Despí to Vilanova i la Geltrú. The riders initially travelled along the coast, crossing the third-category Alt de la Maradona, then turned inland for a long loop. The day's most significant climb, the second-category Alt de la Ventoses, came after , but the roads were otherwise mainly flat. The route turned back towards the coast to the finish.

One of the principal sprinters left in the race, Sky's Ben Swift, pulled out of the stage before the start due to illness. There was again a fast start to the stage. Riders attempted to form a breakaway, but the teams with overall favourites sought to give their riders a chance at contesting the intermediate sprint that came after . The sprint was won by Dan Martin, putting him just one second off the overall podium. After another  of racing, the day's breakaway was finally formed by eleven riders: Petr Vakoč (Etixx–Quick-Step), Esteban Chaves (Orica–GreenEDGE), Laurens Ten Dam (Giant–Alpecin), Ryder Hesjedal (Trek–Segafredo), Bert-Jan Lindeman (LottoNL–Jumbo), Alex Howes (Cannondale), Cameron Meyer (Dimension Data), Axel Domont (AG2R La Mondiale), Romain Hardy and Rudy Molard (both Cofidis), and Marco Minnaard (Wanty–Groupe Gobert). Around halfway through the stage, they had a lead of five minutes but, due to the flat terrain, there were several teams with sprinters who were determined to bring the break back. Lampre–Mérida did most of the work at the front of the peloton; several riders also fell away from the breakaway during the course of the stage. In the final , Trek–Segafredo joined in the chase; Tinkoff then tried to split the peloton in the crosswinds but were unsuccessful.

With  remaining, the breakaway had a 40-second lead. Vakoč made a failed attempt at a solo attack; the lead was reduced to 20 seconds with  remaining. Meyer, Lindeman, Vakoč and Molard attacked again and stayed clear of the peloton into the final kilometre. The chasing group was close, however, and Meyer made another attack; he was caught in the final . Davide Cimolai (Lampre–Mérida) used the slipstream of the breakaway riders to launch his sprint and won the stage comfortably. It was Cimolai's first ever World Tour victory, and Lampre–Mérida's first victory at any level in 2016.

Stage 7 

27 March, Barcelona to Barcelona, 

The final stage followed a  course that started and finished in Barcelona. The stage began by taking the riders north out of the city as far as Ullastrell, where there was a second-category climb. The route then turned back south, crossing a third-category climb as it returned to Barcelona after  of racing. There were then eight laps of a  finishing circuit, each lap including the third-category climb of the Alt de Montjuïc.

Early in the stage, Dan Martin came third in an intermediate sprint, giving him a bonus second. He was level on time with Porte, but moved ahead of him into third place thanks to his better placings through the race. There was then a 12-man breakaway, whose lead was over three minutes at the start of the first circuit. There were attacks in the breakaway group from Lluis Mas and Matej Mohorič (Lampre–Mérida). In the peloton, there was a brief attack by Contador, then a more significant attack from Fabio Aru. Aru was joined by Barguil and Vervaeke and they gained half a minute. They were brought back by Quintana's Movistar team; Froome then immediately made an attack. Quintana chased the move down himself, with Contador, Rodríguez and Navarro following, and the group was caught by the peloton. Hugh Carthy also made an unsuccessful attack.

Mohorič was passed by Alexey Tsatevich (Katusha) and Primož Roglič (LottoNL–Jumbo), who went on to contest a two-man sprint. Tsatevich won the sprint, despite an early celebration that nearly allowed Roglič to come past him. The peloton finished together, 14 seconds behind, with Jarlinson Pantano (IAM) winning the sprint for third place. Quintana therefore sealed his overall victory, with Contador second and Martin third.

Post-race analysis

Reactions 

Quintana described himself as "very pleased and proud" with his victory, describing it as one of the toughest races of his career, especially after his team was reduced to five riders in the final stages. He said, however, that he did not believe he was significantly ahead of Contador, Froome or his other rivals for the major races later in the season, saying that "there's a long way to go for the Tour". Contador, meanwhile, described himself as "very happy with how I'm feeling", though he described it as a "pity" that he had lost Paris–Nice by four seconds and the Volta a Catalunya by seven. He suggested that he could have won the race had he ridden differently on Stage 4 to Port-Ainé. Nicolas Portal, Chris Froome's directeur sportif, described his form as "very encouraging", saying that all he lacked was the top-end speed when the other riders accelerated at the end of the mountain stages. One other prominent performance was that of Hugh Carthy, who finished ninth overall and won the young rider classification. He described it as "by far the best [he'd] ever performed"; Cyclingnews.com described it as a "breakthrough performance".

UCI World Tour standings 

The top ten riders in the Volta a Catalunya general classification were awarded points in the 2016 UCI World Tour competition. Points were also awarded for finishing in the top five places on each stage. With the points from the Volta, Quintana entered the rankings in eighth place, while Contador moved from tenth to third. Despite his fourth place, Porte was unable to defend his first place in the rankings, as Peter Sagan (Tinkoff) had won points from both the E3 Harelbeke and the Gent–Wevelgem and moved into the lead. Tinkoff also moved into the lead of the teams' rankings, while Australia remained top in the nations' rankings.

Classifications 
In the 2016 Volta a Catalunya, four different jerseys were awarded. The most important of these was the general classification, calculated by adding each rider's finishing times on each stage. Time bonuses were awarded to the first three riders at the intermediate sprints on each stage (3, 2 and 1 seconds respectively) and at each stage finish (10, 6 and 4 seconds). The leader wore a white and green jersey. A related competition was the youth classification: the highest-ranked rider born after 1 January 1991 was the leader of this classification and wore a "design" jersey.

Additionally, there was a sprints classification, the leader of which was awarded a white jersey. In the sprints classification, riders received points for finishing in the top three at intermediate sprint points during each stage. There was also a mountains classification, the leadership of which was marked by a red jersey. Points for this classification were won by the first riders to the top of each categorised climb, with more points available for the higher-categorised climbs.

There was also a classification for teams, in which the times of the best three cyclists per team on each stage were added together; the leading team at the end of the race was the team with the lowest total time.

Classification leadership table

Final classifications

References

Sources

Footnotes

External links 
 

Volta a Catalunya by year
Volta a Catalunya
Volta a Catalunya
Volta a Catalunya
March 2016 sports events in Spain